Tubbergen is a municipality and a town in the eastern Netherlands.

Geography
The following population centres can be found in Tubbergen:

Politics
As of the 2018 municipal election, the 19-seat municipal council of Tubbergen is composed as follows.

Society
The municipality has a high birth rate and the lowest divorce rate in the Netherlands. Politically, Tubbergen has the largest share of Christian Democratic Appeal voters at 66.59%.

According to the 2009 survey by the Algemeen Dagblad, Tubbergen has the lowest crime rate of all municipalities in the Netherlands. According to the mayor, this is primarily because there exists a strong sense of community in Tubbergen.

Notable people 

 Clemens Maria Franz von Bönninghausen (1785 near Fleringen – 1864) a lawyer, Dutch and Prussian civil servant, agriculturalist, botanist, physician and pioneer in the field of homeopathy
 Herman Schaepman (1844 in Tubbergen – 1903) a Dutch priest, politician and poet 
 Gerard Bruggink (1917 in Tubbergen – 2005) a Dutch pilot of the Royal Netherlands East Indies Army Air Force

Sport 
 Berny Boxem-Lenferink (born 1948 in Tubbergen) a retired Dutch middle-distance runner, competed at the 1972 Summer Olympics
 Gerco Schröder (born 1978 in Tubbergen) a Dutch show jumping equestrian, participated at the 2004 Summer Olympics
 Nicole Oude Luttikhuis (born 1997 in Harbrinkhoek) a Dutch volleyball player, participated in the Dutch national women's volleyball team

Gallery

References

External links

Official website

 
Municipalities of Overijssel
Populated places in Overijssel
Twente